William Travers Jerome (April 18, 1859 – February 13, 1934) was an American lawyer and politician from New York.

Early life
William Travers Jerome was born in New York City on April 18, 1859. He was the son of Lawrence Jerome (1820–1888, Collector of the Port of Rochester, New York, under President Millard Fillmore, NYC Alderman 1871) and Kate (Hall) Jerome.  Financier Leonard Jerome was his uncle, Jennie Jerome was his first cousin, and U.K. Prime Minister Winston Churchill was his first cousin once removed.

He attended Amherst College but left in 1881 without graduation. He studied law, was admitted to the bar in 1884, and commenced practice in New York City.

Career
From 1888 to 1890, he was a Deputy Assistant D.A. under John R. Fellows.

From 1894 to 1895, he worked for the Lexow Committee. In 1894, he managed the successful campaign of William L. Strong for Mayor of New York City. In 1895, the Court of Special Sessions was re-organized, legislating out of office the six incumbent justices. On July 1, 1895, Jerome took office as one of the first five new justices of the re-organized court.

He was New York County District Attorney from 1902 to 1909, elected in 1901 on the Fusion ticket headed by Seth Low. As D.A. he led a campaign against political corruption and crime, often leading raids personally, notably the one against the gambling house of Richard Canfield. On October 13, 1905, the Republican county convention nominated Judge Charles A. Flammer for D.A. with a vote of 237 to 9. Flammer declined to run, and on October 27 the county convention met again and nominated Jerome in place of Flammer unanimously. However, it was too late to change the names on the ballots, the limit being 20 days before the election. Thus Jerome was re-elected with a plurality of about 4,000 votes as an Independent, while Flammer received more than 12,000 votes on the Republican ticket. In 1907 and 1908, Jerome prosecuted Harry Kendall Thaw for the murder of Stanford White.

In September 1910, Jerome defended successfully former State Engineer Frederick Skene against charges of grand larceny in office.

Personal life
On May 9, 1888, he married Lavinia Taylor Howe, of Elizabeth, New Jersey, and their son was William Travers Jerome, Jr.

He died of pneumonia on February 13, 1934, at his townhouse 125 East 36th Street in Manhattan.

Sources

LAWRENCE JEROME DEAD, his father's obit, in NYT on August 13, 1888
COURT IN THE CORRIDOR in NYT on July 2, 1895
GREATER NEW YORK DEMOCRACY'S CONVENTION in NYT on October 2, 1901
VICTORY FOR THE FUSION TICKET in NYT on November 6, 1901
FLAMMER IS NAMED in NYT on October 14, 1905
REPUBLICAN CONVENTION UNANIMOUS FOR JEROME in NYT on October 28, 1905
JEROME; Elected District Attorney by 3,525 in NYT on November 8, 1905
SKENE'S ASSISTANT BEGINS TESTIMONY in NYT on September 3, 1910
ACCUSER OF SKENE CALLED A PERJURER in NYT on September 6, 1910
JEROME SAYS SKENE WAS TAMMANY'S DUPE in NYT on September 8, 1910
JURY ACQUITS SKENE in NYT on September 9, 1910
MRS. W. T. JEROME HURT IN AUT0 CRASH in NYT on September 26, 1921
JEROME DIES AT 74 in NYT on February 14, 1934 (subscription required)
MRS. W. T. JEROME, 79, DIES IN YONKERS HOME, his widow's obit, in NYT on June 1, 1934 (subscription required)

External links
A Fight for the City, by Alfred Hodder, a novel centered around Jerome's 1901 campaign including first hand chronicles of his campaign.

1859 births
1934 deaths
New York County District Attorneys
Amherst College alumni
New York (state) state court judges
Deaths from pneumonia in New York City
New York (state) Republicans